is a fictional character in the Mario series of video games. She debuted in 1989's Super Mario Land as the ruler of Sarasaland. Described as a tomboy, she used to be rumored to be Luigi's love interest, similarly to Princess Peach being the love interest of Mario, but it is now official after being confirmed by Nintendo. This became the plot of the 1993 live-action film Super Mario Bros., in which Luigi saves Daisy from King Koopa. 

Since her appearance in Mario Tennis, Daisy has been a staple playable character in the Mario spin-off games, often paired with her best friend Peach. She was created by Shigeru Miyamoto's mentor Gunpei Yokoi, the producer of Super Mario Land. Yokoi wanted to recreate the feeling of 1985's Super Mario Bros., only set in another world separate from the Mushroom Kingdom.

Since the release of Mario Golf: Toadstool Tour in 2003, the character has been primarily voiced by American voice actress Deanna Mustard.

Appearances

In video games
Daisy first appeared in Super Mario Land, released in 1989 for the Game Boy. Daisy is the princess of Sarasaland, a world outside of the series' usual setting of the Mushroom Kingdom, and is kidnapped by the tyrannical alien, Tatanga, who intends to marry her to gain control of her realm. Mario must traverse the four kingdoms of Sarasaland to track down Tatanga and rescue Daisy. She next made a small appearance in NES Open Tournament Golf in 1991 as Luigi's caddie. In 2000, Daisy appeared as a playable character in Mario Tennis, developed by Camelot Software Planning for the Nintendo 64, to introduce more human characters into the game. This appearance turned out to be her first big breakthrough, as it paved the way towards her appearing in future Mario spin-offs. Her outfit in Mario Tennis drew similarity to her appearance in NES Open Tournament Golf, but to match the sports criteria, her footwear was replaced by orange sneakers and white high socks. She also had an alternate palette in lavender and indigo for a Player 2 selection in Short Game mode of Mario Tennis. In 2001, she became a playable character in Mario Party 3, where her appearance seemingly matched her artwork in Super Mario Land. Later in the same year, she appeared as a trophy in Super Smash Bros. Melee. She was originally slated to be a playable character in Melee, but the development team lacked the thinking in what moves to provide her, therefore leaving her out and instead using her colors as one of Peach's alternate palettes. In 2002, she received her current design in the video game Mario Party 4.

Daisy is regularly a playable character in Mario sports games. She usually does not wear her iconic dress in the sports games and wears clothing better suited for athletics, with a yellow shirt and orange shorts. She appears in all of the Mario Party series since Mario Party 3 except Mario Party Advance, and all of the Mario Kart games since Double Dash except for the first two installments of the Arcade GP series, and all six games in Mario & Sonic at the Olympic Games. She also appears in the Square Enix game Fortune Street.

In 2015, as part of Super Mario Makers promotion, Nintendo officially inducted Daisy's introductory title, Super Mario Land, into the mainline series of Super Mario games. On September 29, 2017, Daisy was added as a playable character in Super Mario Run. This significantly marked her first playable appearance in a mainline Mario title, as Super Mario Run was included in the franchise's list of mainline video games during the 35th Anniversary of the series.

On January 16, 2016, a Daisy costume and Sarasaland-inspired level were added to Super Mario Maker. In 2016, she also cameos in the Battle Card mode in Mario & Luigi: Paper Jam, as her first appearance in a Mario RPG. Daisy was included as a skin in the Minecraft: Wii U Edition Super Mario Mash-Up Pack, released on May 16, 2016. In every Super Smash Bros. game released since Super Smash Bros. Melee, Daisy has appeared as a collectable trophy, and as one of Peach's palette swaps, representing Daisy's color scheme. As revealed during the Nintendo Direct: E3 2018 presentation, Daisy appears in Super Smash Bros. Ultimate as a playable character, where she is an "Echo Fighter" (moveset-clone) of Princess Peach, playing largely identical to her with only minor differences. Daisy's Amiibo figurine for the Super Mario franchise was released on November 4, 2016, to coincide with the release of Mario Party: Star Rush. Meanwhile, her Amiibo figurine related to the Super Smash Bros. franchise was released on February 13, 2019. Daisy, alongside Wario and Waluigi, were added to Dr. Mario World as a post-launch update in 2019. In 2022, She was also added as a post-launch downloadable character to Mario Strikers: Battle League.

In other media
Daisy is one of the main characters of 1993's Super Mario Bros. film, loosely based on the games, portrayed by Samantha Mathis. She is a student of archaeology at New York University whom Luigi falls in love with. While digging for dinosaur bones under the Brooklyn Bridge, Daisy is kidnapped by two henchmen of President Koopa, the dictator of Dinohattan, of which Daisy is the rightful princess. Daisy has also appeared several times throughout Kodansha's Super Mario manga series, and in some episodes of the Nintendo Comics System. Universal Studios Japan and Universal Studios Hollywood's immersive Super Nintendo World areas include Daisy, with her appearing in the Mario Kart: Bowser’s Challenge attraction and the Super Nintendo World sections of Universal Studios' smartphone applications. The interactive "Power-Up Bands" feature a design based on her dress.

Reception
Initially, Daisy drew little criticism or praise. In her early appearances, she was so similar to Princess Peach that some journalists assumed "Princess Daisy" was simply a new localization of "Princess Peach" rather than a new character.

Polygon lists Daisy at number six of the top ten Mario Tennis Aces characters ranked by the online audience, stating: "She's had a healthy share of posts and fan art dedicated to her". GameDaily listed Daisy at number eight in a top-ten list of Mario characters who deserve their own game. GamerVision's "Coop" wrote the article "Top Ten Reasons Daisy is Better Than Peach", citing her "less-annoying voice" and "better attitude", and being a better ruler because Sarasaland has only been invaded once, while Peach's Mushroom Kingdom is always being invaded. Destructoid's Gamer's Red Carpet called "her choice of a brave yellow and orange combo dress... as flattering as it is retro", and that her dress and accessories "work much better than Peach's", grading her a B+ overall. She is number two on Susanna Sheath of ScrewAttack's top ten Mario characters. The character has a loyal fanbase that has expressed their love for her via social media, such as when Mario Strikers: Battle League'''s base-roster was revealed. 

Daisy's relationship with Luigi has occasionally been a point of discussion within the gaming community. GamesRadar's Henry Gilbert wrote that it became increasingly evident that Luigi also needs "his own princess" and Princess Daisy is the character to whom he is closest. The pairing of Daisy and Luigi was included in Screw Attack's "Best EVER: Love Stories" video. DenOfGeek.com points out that with no rescue narrative between Daisy and Luigi as the basis for romance, she chooses him based on his merits instead of gratitude. In 2010, Audrey Drake at IGN listed Daisy as a potential valentine for Mario, commenting that being his "brother's gal" made her a sort of "forbidden fruit", and that he had saved her during the events of Super Mario Land.

IGN reviewed Daisy negatively at four out of ten, whereas Princess Peach got an eight, Rosalina a seven, and Pauline an eight, but said that the "spark between Daisy and Luigi still burns bright". Lisa Foiles of The Escapist ranked Daisy number one of the top five annoying princesses in video games, but stated she didn't really have a good reason. John Teti of The A.V. Club reviewed Daisy negatively, calling her dress "unflattering" and describing her as a "Princess Peach with brown hair" whose tomboy moniker is undeserved as "euphemistic nonsense". Jeremy Parish of Polygon ranked seventy-three fighters from Super Smash Bros. Ultimate "from garbage to glorious", listing Rosalina at number fifty-one, Princess Daisy at thirty-one, and Princess Peach at number four. Daisy's infant counterpart, Baby Daisy, was listed by 1UP.com as one of the worst Mario Kart Wii'' characters.

References

Fantasy film characters
Female characters in video games
Luigi
Mario (franchise) characters
Nintendo protagonists
Princess characters in video games
Super Mario Land
Super Smash Bros. fighters
Video game characters introduced in 1989